Halcyon Castle (now called The Kovalam Palace) was built in 1932 in the princely state of Travancore, in the modern-day state of Kerala, India. It was constructed by M.R.Ry Sri Rama Varma Valiya Koil Thampuran, the consort of Maharani Sethu Lakshmi Bayi, as a retreat for their family. In 1964 Valiya Koil Thampuran sold the entire property to the Government of India; since then it has been a luxury hotel. A dispute arose when the India Tourism Development Corporation (ITDC), which was running the hotel, sold it to a private hotel resort group. It has since then been taken under The Raviz Hotels and Resorts and been renovated and restored to its former glory.

Status 
Ravi Pillai owns the hotel and the entire adjoining land area measuring around 65 acres; he has contracted with the Leela Hotel Group to manage the 5-Star hotel. It is a heritage palace that has been completely refurbished to maintain its original charm and is now available for guests.

Suites 

The Palace has 4 suites named after the royal family and the goddesses after whom the queens were named. The four uber luxurious suites are coloured red, rusty orange, blue and green with a view of The Arabian sea from each of the rooms. The renovated palace has Murano Chandeliers and Mantellassi furnishings and has state of the art automation.

References 

Hotels in Thiruvananthapuram
Palaces in Thiruvananthapuram
Buildings and structures completed in 1932
1932 establishments in India
20th-century architecture in India